Muir is a surname. Notable people with the surname include:


A–J
Adam Muir (born 1971), Australian rugby league footballer
Alex Muir (1923–1995), Scottish footballer
Alex Muir (Albion Rovers footballer), Scottish footballer
Alexander Muir, songwriter, poet and school headmaster
Andrew Muir (chess player) (born 1958), Scottish chess player
Andrew Muir (politician), Northern Irish politician
Barry Muir (born 1937), Australian rugby league footballer
Bill Muir  (born 1942), American football coach
Bryan Muir (born 1973), Canadian National Hockey League player
Chris Muir (cartoonist) (born 1958), U.S. cartoonist (webcomic Day by Day)
David Muir, anchor of ABC World News Tonight
Debbie Muir (born 1953), Canadian former synchronized swimmer and coach
Edwin Muir (1887–1959), British poet, novelist and translator, husband of Willa Muir
Florabel Muir (1889-1970), American journalist, writer, and newspaper columnist
Francis Muir (born 1926), British geophysicist
Frank Muir (1920–1998), British comedian
Gary Muir (born 1985), Scottish footballer
 Harry Muir (fl.1960s–1980s), owner of Beck Book Company, forerunner of Wakefield Press in Adelaide, South Australia
Hope Muir, Canadian dancer, rehearsal director and teacher
Ian Muir (Scottish footballer) (1929–2009), Scottish footballer (Motherwell)
Ian Muir (born 1963), English footballer (Tranmere Rovers)
Jamie Muir (politician), Canadian educator and politician
Jamie Muir, Scottish painter and former percussionist
Jean Muir (actress) (1911–1996), American actress
Jean Muir (1928–1995), British fashion designer
Jo Muir (born 1994), British modern pentathlete
John Kenneth Muir (born 1969), U.S. writer on film and television
John Muir (1838–1914), naturalist, engineer, explorer, and writer
John Muir (disambiguation), several people
John Muir (South African naturalist) (1874–1947), South African naturalist and cultural historian
John Muir (indologist) (1810–1882), Scottish sanskritist

K–Z
 Kado Muir, Aboriginal Australian artist and land rights advocate 
Karen Muir (1952–2013), South African swimmer
Kenneth Muir (disambiguation), several people
Kenneth Muir (scholar) (1907–1996), literary scholar and author
Kenneth Muir (VC) (1912–1950), British soldier
Kirsty Muir (born 2004), Scottish freestyle skier
Laura Muir (born 1993), Scottish athlete
Leilani Muir (born 1944), Canadian plaintiff
Lewis F. Muir (1883–1915), American composer
Lindsay Muir (born 1956), Scottish footballer
Lois Muir (born 1935), New Zealand sportswoman
M. M. Pattison Muir (1848–1931), chemist and author
Malcolm Muir (1885–1979), U.S. magazine industrialist
Malcolm Muir (judge) (1914–2011), American judge
Marjorie Muir Worthington (1900–1976), American writer
Mike Muir (born 1964), U.S. singer
Nat Muir (born 1958), Scottish athlete
Norrie Muir (1948–2019), British mountaineer
Richard David Muir (1857–1924), British prosecutor
Robert Muir (disambiguation), several people
Robbie Muir (footballer), Australian rules footballer
Ruby Muir, cross-country runner from New Zealand
Tamsyn Muir, novelist from New Zealand
Thomas Muir (disambiguation), several people
Thomas Muir (mathematician) (1844–1934), British mathematician
Thomas Muir of Huntershill (1765–1799), Scottish political reformer 
Walter Muir (soccer) (born 1953), Scottish footballer 
Willa Muir (1890–1970), Scottish novelist, essayist and translator, wife of Edwin Muir
William Muir (1819–1905), British orientalist, founder of Muir College
William Muir (coach) (1895–1967), college sports coach

Fictional characters
 Lucy Muir, a character in the 1947 film The Ghost and Mrs. Muir 
 Carolyn Muir, a character in the subsequent TV series (1968)

Scottish surnames
English-language surnames